Marinospirillum celere is a helical, haloalkaliphilic and Gram-negative bacterium from the genus of Marinospirillum which has been isolated from sediments from the Mono Lake in the United States.

References

Oceanospirillales
Bacteria described in 2009